Surfin' Bird is the debut studio album by the Trashmen, released on 14 January 1964. It was named after their novelty hit of the same name. The album peaked at No. 48 at the Billboard 200 chart.

The album was recorded at Kay Bank Studio and rushed to the stores to capitalize on the success of the "Surfin' Bird" single, released two months earlier. According to Rick Shefchik's book Everybody's Heard about the Bird, which chronicles the band's rise and fall, both the Surfin' Bird album and the single each went on to sell over a million copies. Richie Unterberger of AllMusic, who gave the album 4.5 stars out of 5, wrote that it "actually outstrips most of the Southern California-based competition, due to the ferocious grit of the playing and a vaguely demented, go-for-broke recklessness."

1964 LP release
Two editions are known to have an incorrect track list on the back of the sleeve – the track listing printed on the vinyl is correct, though. Interestingly, the erroneous track list was later used for the 1995 CD reissue (see below).

The LP incorrectly credits the title track to Steve Wahrer, the band's drummer and vocalist. "Surfin' Bird" is actually a fusion of two songs by the Rivingtons: "The Bird's the Word" and "Papa-Oom-Mow-Mow". Following legal threats by the group, the song was re-attributed to all four members of the Rivingtons.

"Kuk" is a song originally by the Astronauts. For reasons unknown, some copies of the album credit Rich Fifield, but not Jon Patterson, while others credit Patterson, but not Fifield. The 1995 reissue has Fifield listed in the credits, not Patterson.

1995 CD reissue
In 1995, the album received an official CD reissue by Sundazed Music. This release uses a different track order, and adds four extra songs.

1990 CD compilation
A label called Request Record released a CD called Surfin' Bird in 1990. The first 12 tracks of it comprise the original Surfin' Bird LP, in the same track order. The next 12 tracks are singles by the Trashmen. The last 2 tracks are "Cyclon"/"Sally-Jo", the A-side of a 1961 single by and the sole release of Jim Thaxter and the Travelers, a band which The Trashmen grew out of. The last 14 tracks were previously released on the 1965 compilation album Bird Dance Beat, so this 1990 release is essentially a bundling of the Surfin' Bird and Bird Dance Beat albums. It is technically the earliest known CD reissue of Surfin Bird, although it is likely unofficial.

Personnel
The Trashmen:
 Tony Andreason – lead guitar
 Dal Winslow – rhythm guitar
 Robert Reed – bass guitar
 Steve Wahrer – drums, vocals

Production:
 George Garrett – producer
 Tom Jung – engineer
 Bill Diehl – liner notes

References

1964 debut albums